Terezie Císařová, known as Thea Červenková (or Tea Červenková) was the second Czechoslovak woman film director (the first one is considered to be Olga Rautenkranzová), screenwriter, writer, documentary maker, film actress, film journalist and critic, producer, film company owner and founding partner.

During her short film career in Czechoslovakia (1918–1923), Červenková occupied several professions — she translated continuity intertitles, wrote eight scripts, directed eight movies, four of which were produced by her own company Filmový ústav, and wrote articles for the pioneering trade film magazine Československý film. She was known as the "lady crazy about film".

Early life
Thea Červenková was born to butcher's family living on Klicperova (Záhřebská) Street in Vinohrady in Prague. It is assumed that she studied abroad, possible at director Max Reinhardt's. There is no other extant evidence of her youth, connected to her private or professional life.

Career
At first, Červenková was interested in literary work. She worked for a theatre, she dramatized literary artworks, for example her dramatization of novel Hřích paní Hýrové by Václav Štech was performed by Prague theatre Uranie in 1915. She wrote also a memory book, Toulky moravským Slovenskem, in 1917.

The sources differ about the fact, when and how Červenková entered the film business. One version says that she shot together with her later frequent co-worker cinematographer Josef Brabec (1890–1977) a movie Láska a dřeváky (Love and Wooden Shoes) as early as in 1914. But the movie is not preserved and as a director is credited only Josef Brabec. Other version is that Červenková and Josef Brabec founded together the film company Slavia in June 1918.

After the coup for Czechoslovakian independence in October 1918, Červenková sold Slavia to the Austrian firm Sascha-Film but remained being director in the company. The most probable version (according to Brabec's words) is that Červenková got her first job in film business in Pragafilm company as a scriptwriter and editor of subtitles. There she met Brabec, who also worked for the company. After the 1918 coup, the branch renamed to Slaviafilm. At that time, Slaviafilm operated at film market as a film distributor, but soon it became also a film production company. Červenková helped initiate this change and became responsible for directing and scriptwriting.

Slaviafilm period

Shortly before outbreak of the coup, Červenková wrote for Slaviafilm her first script according to story by Jaroslav Kruis to a short movie Lásko třikrát svatá (Love Sacred Three Times, dir. Karel M. Klos, 1918). Immediately after coup, she was accused of unpatriotic behavior by press because of shooting the coup in the streets of Prague for purposes of the Austrian company. Her first movie as director was a short film comedy Náměsíčný (Sleepwalker, 1919). After that, she wrote a story and script to comedy Ada se učí jezdit (Ada Learns to Drive, dir. Ada Karlovský, 1919). In the same year she directed further short comedies or grotesques: Monarchistické spiknutí (The Monarchist Conspiracy), Zloděj (The Thief) and Byl první máj (On the First of May). Zloděj and Byl první máj are the only Červenková's extant films from this period. In Zloděj Červenková also played a small role of a housemaid who was drugged by baron, whose intention was to have a free access to her landlady.

Červenková as a journalist

During the years 1919–1920 Červenková contributed to trade film magazine Československý film, for example Film, jeho význam a národnost (Film, Its Meaning and Nationality), Naše filmová dramaturgie (Our Film Dramaturgy), Prvá československá soutěž na domácí libreta (The First Czechoslovakian Competition on National Librettos). In her articles is obvious ambition for increase the level of Czechoslovak film. She realized how important cinema could be for a nation: “Film is a deep well of knowledge, film will become more influential than press, film is an art which mustn’t be profaned by flag-waving or turned into a cash cow… But film is also a national credo, a declaration… and this mustn’t be forgotten.”

Filmový Ústav period

Conviction of the value of the film as art and the need for development “higher artistic film that would be adaptation of valuable literary works” led to the establishment of Filmový ústav. Filmový ústav was founded by Červenková and Brabec in the second half of 1919, after they left Slaviafilm. It is possible that it was caused also by change of Slaviafilm only to a distribution company. Filmový ústav was a family-character production company. Červenková built workshop, studio and laboratory in her family house in Vinohrady, in the backyard of the house were shot interiors of her movies. Červenková and Brabec did not have a commercial plan with their company, they only wanted to earn money for their next movies. Filmový ústav produced Červenková's films: Babička (The Grandmother, 1921), Košile šťastného člověka (Happy Man Shirt, 1921), Ty petřínské stráně/ Bludička (The Slopes of Petřín, 1922) and Paličova dcéra (The Arsonist's Daughter, 1923). The company stood also behind documentaries about national figures and cultural features, for example Havlíček, jeho život a literární význam (Havlíček, His Life and Significance in Literature) and Křest sv. Vladimíra (Baptism of St. Vladimír). Most of the documentaries were shot by Červenková. In Filmový ústav debuted also directors J.T. Shaw (Rytíř bledé růže/ Knight of Light Rose, 1921) and Václav Wasserman (Kam s ním?/ Where to with Him?, 1922).

The most important Červenková's movie was Babička. It was the first film adaptation of popular Czech literary classic by Božena Němcová. But Červenková's movies were not popular, neither commercially nor among critics. She was criticized mainly because of fast and low-budget production and lack of film education. But Červenková's contribution to early Czechoslovak film business is obvious – at first, as journalist who enforced perception of moviemaking as part of creating national identity, and also was one of the pioneers who adapted literary and theatre works for movies. From this period are two movies extant: Babička and Pavličova dcéra.

Filmový ústav finished its activities because of economic crisis in 1923. Červenková left to Brasil to her brother's. Since then, there is no evidence about her life and activities, either about her only son. She died in São Paulo in Brazil in 1961 (or in 1957, as some sources state).

Filmography
As director:
Paličova dcera (1923) (writer, director)
Ty petřínské stráně (1922) (writer only)
Babička (1921) (director only)
Košile šťastného člověka (1921) (writer, director)
Monarchistické spiknutí (1919) (director only)
Náměsíčný (1919) (director only)
Byl první máj (1919) (writer, director)
Zloděj (1919) (writer, director, actress)
Ada se učí jezdit (1919) (writer only)
Lásko třikrát svatá (1918) (writer only)

Further reading
 Český hraný film I, 1898 – 1930. Praha: Národní filmový archiv. 1995.
 Červenková, Thea: Film, jeho význam a národnost. Československý film. 2:6 (1 April 1919).
 Havelka, Jiří: 50 let Československého filmu. Praha: Československý státní film. 1953.
 Štábla, Zdeněk: Data a fakta z dějin československé kinematografie, 1896 – 1945. Vol. 2. Praha: Čs. Filmový Ústav. 1989.

References

External links
 Thea Červenková at Women Film Pioneers Project
 Thea Červenková at Internet Movie Database
 Thea Červenková at Czechoslovak Film Database (Czech)

1882 births
20th-century deaths
Year of death uncertain
Film directors from Prague
People from the Kingdom of Bohemia
Czech women film directors
Silent film directors
Czechoslovak film directors
Women film pioneers